Beğendik (sometimes pronounced as Beyendik) is a belde (town) in Keşan district of Edirne Province, Turkey.

Prior to the 20th century, the population of the village was composed of Greeks and the Greek name of the village was Ηρωικό (Heroic). According to tradition, the creator of its Turkish name was Lala Şahin Pasha of the Ottoman Empire in the 14th century (Beğendik means "We liked"). Beğendik preserved its Greek character up to the 20th century. After the Turkish War of Independence, according to the population exchange agreement, the Greek population was replaced by Turkish population. 

In 1969, Beğendik was declared a seat of the township. 

The population was 3172 as of 2013.

References

Towns in Turkey
Populated places in Keşan District